Patrick Smith may refer to:

Writers
Patrick Smith (journalist), Australian sports journalist who writes for The Australian
Patrick Smith (columnist), American author and pilot
Patrick D. Smith (1927–2014), Florida author who wrote A Land Remembered
Patrick Sean Smith, American television show creator, writer, and producer
Patrick Smith, editor of Africa Confidential newsletter

Others
Patrick Smith (fighter) (born 1963), boxer, kickboxer and mixed martial artist
Patrick Smith (politician) (1901–1982), Irish politician who served in Dáil Éireann
Patrick Smith (artist) (born 1972), American artist and animator
Patrick Henry Smith (1827–1884), Wisconsin merchant and legislator
Patrick "J. Que" Smith (born 1975), American record producer and songwriter
Patrick Smith (skateboarder), American skateboarder and skate company owner

See also
Pat Smith (disambiguation)
Paddy Smith (disambiguation)
Patrick Smyth (disambiguation)
Patrick Smythe (disambiguation)